The Grand Constitutional Lodge of Peru is a Masonic Grand Lodge that is in the tradition of Continental Freemasonry and is a member of CLIPSAS.

References

Grand Lodges
Clubs and societies in Peru